Carryover may refer to:
 Carryover effect, in automated analyzer
Carryover basis, in taxation
 Carryover cooking
 Carryover with steam, in power generation